The 1921–22 Northern Football League season was the 29th in the history of the Northern Football League, a football competition in Northern England.

Clubs

The league featured 13 clubs which competed in the last season, along with one new club:
 Cockfield

League table

References

1921-22
1921–22 in English football leagues